Cyperus pectinatus is a species of sedge that is native to much of Africa.

See also
List of Cyperus species

References

pectinatus
Plants described in 1805
Flora of Angola
Flora of Benin
Flora of Botswana
Flora of Burkina Faso
Flora of Burundi
Flora of Cameroon
Flora of Chad
Flora of the Republic of the Congo
Flora of the Democratic Republic of the Congo
Flora of the Central African Republic
Flora of Ethiopia
Flora of Gabon
Flora of Ghana
Flora of Guinea
Flora of Ivory Coast
Flora of Kenya
Flora of Liberia
Flora of Madagascar
Flora of Malawi
Flora of Mali
Flora of Mauritania
Flora of Niger
Flora of Nigeria
Flora of Rwanda
Flora of Senegal
Flora of Sierra Leone
Flora of Sudan
Flora of Swaziland
Flora of Tanzania
Flora of Uganda
Flora of Togo
Flora of Zambia
Flora of Zimbabwe
Taxa named by Martin Vahl